The 2000–01 Slovenian PrvaLiga season started on 21 July 2000 and ended on 27 May 2001. Each team played a total of 33 matches.

League table

Results

Matches 1–22

Matches 23–33

Top goalscorers 

Source: PrvaLiga.si

See also
2000–01 Slovenian Football Cup
2000–01 Slovenian Second League

References
General

Specific

External links
Official website of the PrvaLiga 

Slovenian PrvaLiga seasons
Slovenia
1